Fāțima bint Ibrahim ibn Mahmūd al-Bațā'ihiyya also known as Fatima al-Batayahiyyah was a Muslim scholar of hadith in the 8th century.

Biography
Fatima al-Batayahiyyah taught Sahih Bukhari in Damascus. She was known as one of the greatest scholars of that period, demonstrated especially during the Hajj when leading male scholars of the day flocked from afar to hear her speak in person.

When she had become old, she moved to Madinah  and taught her students for days in the Prophet's mosque itself. Whenever she tired, she would rest her head on the Muhammad's grave and continue to teach her students. This tradition is contrasted with the practice today, where people are not allowed view Muhammad's resting place.

References 

8th-century Muslim scholars of Islam